Hartlepool by-election or The Hartlepools by-election may refer to:

 1875 Hartlepool by-election
 1910 The Hartlepools by-election
 1914 The Hartlepools by-election
 1943 The Hartlepools by-election
 2004 Hartlepool by-election
 2021 Hartlepool by-election